Timur Gareyev (sometimes spelled Gareev; born March 3, 1988) is an Uzbeki-American chess grandmaster. He was born in Tashkent to Tatar parents. Gareyev was a part of the University of Texas at Brownsville's chess team from August 2005 to August 2006 and from August 2009 to December 2011 where he helped the university obtain its first national championship along with other collegiate honors. In 2007, he tied for first with Vladimir Egin and Anton Filippov in the Uzbekistani Chess Championship. Gareyev has participated in two Chess Olympiads: 2004 Calvià, Spain and 2006 Turin, Italy. Gareyev won the 20th Annual Chicago Open and the 11th Metropolitan Chess FIDE Invitational tournament.

Gareyev graduated with B.A. degree in Business Marketing from the University of Texas at Brownsville. He lived and promoted chess in Southern California but now lives in Kansas. Gareyev won the North American Open 2012 and tied for third in the U.S. Chess Championship 2013. He won the U.S. Open with an 8-1 clear-first-place score in 2018. Gareyev's simultaneous blindfold chess record includes a 19-game blindfold simul in Cypress, Texas, September 2012, a 27-game (set in stages) simul in Hawaii Dec 2012, a 33-game (set in stages) match in St Louis, May 2013 and a world record 48-board simul in Las Vegas, on December 4, 2016.

Gareyev's win in the 2018 US Open qualified him for a place in the 2019 U.S. Chess Championship, where he finished in a three-way tie for 9th place out of a field of 12.

In 2020, Gareyev won first place in the 27th annual Western Class Championship tied with John Daniel Bryant.

Gareyev is also a skydiver with close to 150 solo jumps. When Gareyev won the 119th edition of the U.S. Open, Chess Life magazine published his sky-diving photo with a chess board as a cover.

References

External links
 
 
  
 The United States Chess Federation - Obama Visits and Gareev Wins in Philly

1988 births
Volga Tatar people
Living people
Chess grandmasters
Uzbekistani chess players
American chess players
Sportspeople from Tashkent
Uzbekistani people of Tatar descent
American people of Tatar descent